Kõrkküla is a village in Viru-Nigula Parish, Lääne-Viru County in northeastern Estonia. It's located on the coast of the Gulf of Finland, by the Tallinn–Narva (Saint Petersburg) road (part of E20), just southeast of Aseri. Kõrkküla has a population of 40 (as of 10 January 2012).

Kõrkküla was first mentioned in 1466.

There is a limestone cross beside the road to memorialize a Russian boyar Vassili Rosladin, who was killed there in 1590.

References

Villages in Lääne-Viru County